Centennial Park is a suburb split between the local government area of the City of Sydney and the City of Randwick, located  from the Sydney central business district, in the eastern suburbs of Sydney in the state of New South Wales, Australia.

Centennial Park is home to a number of wild animals including birds, rabbits, and foxes. It is also home to a number of equestrian schools and other domestic animal endeavours such as the Centennial Park Rabbit Retreat, a boarding facility for rabbits in the Centennial Park and Paddington area.

Geography 
The western fringe of the suburb is used for residential purposes and is within the City of Sydney. It features quality houses on large blocks as well as large multi-unit buildings. The bulk of the suburb consists of the Centennial Parklands (from which the suburb takes its name) and is within the City of Randwick. The parklands extend further partly into the suburb of Queens Park, adjacent to (but separate from) the park of the same name in that suburb.

History 
Centennial Park started out as a reserve to protect the central ponds and swamps which formed early Sydney's water supply. When it was superseded by the Nepean water supply system in the 1880s it was decided to create a large park, which opened as Centennial Park in 1888. Part of the funding was to come from selling off residential lots adjacent to the park, but this did not occur until 1904 when  of land along the western border was subdivided. To ensure high standards of residential development, strict requirements were imposed. No wooden buildings or terrace homes were allowed; brick or stone were mandated, with tile or slate roofs. Between 1905 and 1925, a wide range of substantial, quality homes were built, featuring a mixture of Federation, Arts and Crafts, Victorian and Old English styles. The streets created were Martin Road, Robertson Road, Lang Road and Cook Road.

Notable houses

 Patrick White house (also known as Highbury), was the home of writer Patrick White for many years, until his death. It is heritage-listed.
 The Crossways is an example of the international Arts and Crafts style. It was designed by Waterhouse and Lake and built in 1908. The Crossways was built as part of the subdivision of 1904 that created the suburb, and was the home of physician/surgeon Dr Craig Gordon. It is heritage-listed.
 Devon is a distinctive example of the Arts and Crafts style. It is heritage-listed.
 Murrulla is a two-storey home in the Federation Anglo-Dutch style, which is rare in residential architecture. The first known occupant was Solomon Cohen in 1908. The house has a state heritage listing.
 The Bungalow is a heritage-listed home in the California Bungalow style. It has a skillion roof that distinguishes it from other bungalows like the ranger's cottage in the park.
 Devoncliffe is a two-storey mansion designed in the Federation Free Classical style and made of sandstone. It was built c.1910 and is heritage-listed.
 Walshome was built c.1890 and features the polychrome brickwork style that was popular at the time. It is an example of the architecture of the Boom Era, when people were building elaborate homes to display their wealth. It is listed on the Register of the National Estate.
 Stanton Hall (also known as Babington) is an example of the Inter-War Free Classical style, and is heritage-listed.

Heritage listings
Centennial Park has a number of heritage-listed sites, including:
 3R Oxford Street: Centennial Park Reservoir
 5R Oxford Street: Woollahra Reservoir
 20 Martin Road: Patrick White house

Population
At the 2021 census, 2,225 people were living in Centennial Park.

In the 2016 census, there were 2,376 people in Centennial Park. 57.0% of people were born in Australia. The next most common country of birth was England at 6.1%. 70.6% of people only spoke English at home. The most common responses for religion were No Religion, so described 34.9% and Catholic 24.0%.

Climate

Gallery

References

 
Suburbs of Sydney
City of Sydney
City of Randwick